John Jolly (27 July 1912 – 9 July 1995) was a New Zealand cricketer. He played one first-class match for Otago in 1933/34. Born in Cromwell, Otago, Jolly was a left hand bat (when batting), and a right hand medium when bowling. John Jolly died in Sydney, Australia, aged 82.

See also
 List of Otago representative cricketers

References

External links
 

1912 births
1995 deaths
New Zealand cricketers
Otago cricketers
People from Cromwell, New Zealand